Francis Gregory (second ¼ 1904 – death unknown), also known as "Francis St. Clair Gregory", was a Cornish wrestler of the 1920s and 1930s, Cornish wrestling referee (stickler) of the 1960s, professional boxer of the 1920s, rugby union footballer who played in the 1920s and 1930s, professional wrestler of the 1930s through to 1963, and professional rugby league footballer who played in the 1930s and 1940s. Francis Gregory wrestled professionally under the name Francis St. Clair Gregory, his sobriquet of 'St. Clair' is purportedly the name of town in Brittany visited by Cornish wrestlers for wrestling tournaments.

Background
Francis Gregory was born in St Wenn, Cornwall, and his birth was registered in Bodmin, Cornwall.

Cornish wrestling career
Francis Gregory is considered the most notable Cornish Wrestler since the foundation of the Cornish Wrestling Association in 1923, and the last of the "Great" Cornish wrestlers, he was the youngest member of the squad that took part in a two-week-long exhibition to promote Cornish wrestling at the London Palladium in the 1920s, he represented Cornwall as heavyweight champion against Brittany at the first seven Cornu-Breton tournaments, winning on every occasion, including victories over the famous Breton champions; René Scordia and Robert Cadic, he was known as "The Champion Who Never Smiled". He won the Cornish Wrestling Heavyweight Belt every year from 1928 to 1936.

Professional wrestling career
Francis Gregory appeared on the first televised wrestling match in the United Kingdom, a bout against Mike Marino at West Ham Municipal Baths (now Atherton Leisure Centre) on Wednesday 9 November 1955.

Boxing career
Francis Gregory had four professional boxing contests in 1929.

Rugby playing career

International honours

Rugby league
Francis Gregory won a cap for England (RL) while at Warrington in 1939 against Wales.

Club career

Rugby union
Francis Gregory played rugby union for Redruth R.F.C.

Rugby league
Francis Gregory made his début for Wigan in the 17–11 victory over Oldham at Central Park, Wigan on Saturday 29 August 1936, scored his first try for Wigan in the 11–9 victory over Broughton Rangers at Central Park, Wigan on Saturday 14 November 1936, scored his last try for Wigan in the 37–17 victory over Halifax at Central Park, Wigan on Wednesday 17 February 1937, and he played his last match for Wigan in the 10–2 victory over Hull F.C. at Central Park, Wigan on Saturday 30 October 1937.

Francis Gregory played left-, i.e. number 11, in Leeds 15–10 victory over Halifax in the 1941–42 Challenge Cup Final at Odsal Stadium, Bradford, on Saturday 6 June 1942.

Genealogical information
Francis Gregory was the father of the professional wrestlers, Roy St. Clair, and Tony St. Clair.

Outside of sport
Francis Gregory was the landlord of a pub in Manchester .

References

External links

Profile at wrestlingheritage.co.uk
Statistics at wigan.rlfans.com
Statistics at wrestlingdata.com
The Rise And Fall Of The Tin Mining Industry In Cornwall
Statistics at boxinghistory.org.uk
Hall of Fame – The Heyday of Redruth Rugby Club
Robert Caric, Un Grand Champion De Lutte Bretonne
Cornish wrestling – the last round?
Wrestling by Michael Tresillian
Statistics at wolvesplayers.thisiswarrington.co.uk

1904 births
Cornish wrestling champions
England national rugby league team players
English male boxers
English male professional wrestlers
English rugby league players
English rugby union players
People from Bodmin
Place of death missing
Rugby league players from Cornwall
Rugby league props
Rugby league second-rows
Rugby union players from Cornwall
Warrington Wolves players
Wigan Warriors players
Year of death missing